Admiral Sir Reginald Aylmer Ranfurly Plunkett-Ernle-Erle-Drax, KCB, DSO, JP, DL ( Plunkett; 28 August 1880 – 16 October 1967), commonly known as Reginald Plunkett or Reginald Drax, was an Anglo-Irish admiral. The younger son of the 17th Baron of Dunsany, he was Director of the Royal Naval Staff College, President of the Naval Inter-Allied Commission of Control in (Berlin), commander-in-chief of successive Royal Navy bases.  His brother Edward, who became the 18th Baron of Dunsany, was best known as the famous playwright and author Lord Dunsany.  Edward inherited the paternal estates in Ireland, while Reginald was bequeathed most of his mother's inheritance across portions of the West Indies, Kent, Surrey, Dorset, Wiltshire and Yorkshire.  He extended his surname by special Royal licence in 1916, and was noted for the quadruple-name result, Plunkett-Ernle-Erle-Drax.

Early life and education
Sir Reginald was born in Marylebone, Westminster, the younger son of John Plunkett, 17th Baron of Dunsany (1853–1899) and his wife, Ernle Elizabeth Louisa Maria Grosvenor Burton, later Plunkett-Ernle-Erle-Drax (1855–1916). At 13 days old, he was christened at Holy Trinity Church, Marylebone.

His elder brother was the celebrated Lord Dunsany, a prolific writer and author of more than 60 books.

He was educated at Cheam School and joined the Royal Navy at the age of 14, training aboard the stationary school ship HMS Britannia from July 1894 to 1896.

His parents were distant cousins who came from influential and wealthy families. His father was the 17th Lord Dunsany, one of the oldest titles in the Peerage of Ireland. His mother, Ernle, was the daughter of Col. Francis Augustus Plunkett Burton (son of Admiral Ryder Burton and his wife, Anne Plunkett, the daughter of Randal Plunkett, 13th Baron Dunsany) and Sarah Charlotte Elizabeth Sawbridge-Erle-Drax (died 1905; daughter of John Sawbridge and his wife, Jane, daughter of Richard Erle-Drax-Grosvenor). Following the death of her brother, Richard, Jane became the sole heiress of Charborough House and other Erle-Drax estates. 
 
After his grandmother Jane's death in 1905, Sir Reginald's mother added the additional surname Ernle on 20 December 1905 (becoming Ernle Plunkett-Ernle), then added Erle and Drax on 20 December 1906 (becoming Ernle Plunkett-Ernle-Erle-Drax), both by royal licence.

She died in 1916, leaving Reginald the majority of her vast estates in Dorset, Kent, Surrey, Wiltshire, Yorkshire, and the West Indies. He assumed the additional surnames of Ernle-Erle-Drax on 4 October 1916 by royal licence. His long series of titles, Christian names, surnames and post-nominals has made him famous beyond his career as an admiral in the Royal Navy.

Early career 
In 1896, Drax passed out of the Britannia as a midshipman. He was promoted Lieutenant on 15 January 1901. In 1909 he received an appointment to the Staff College, Camberley, to conduct an in-depth study of the subject of staff training and its application.

In 1909, the Admiralty published his book, Modern Naval Tactics. He hoped that it would contribute to a projected official tactical handbook. It drew on an analysis of gunnery from the recent experience of the Battle of Tsushima. He expected that visibility in the North Sea would limit the maximum range of battle fleet duels to 10,000 yards, but recognised that the need to stay outside improving torpedo range would increase gunnery ranges.

He also discussed in the book how to utilise cruisers as a fast wing to the battle fleet; the possible tactics of an inferior fleet, such as the High Seas Fleet; and the impact of ships zigzagging would have on gunnery.

The Times obituary claimed that Drax's book was dismissed by the skeptical older generation of admirals, who thought it highly presumptuous for a lowly lieutenant to write with authority on naval tactics. However, the book did succeed in making Drax a man of note. In 1912, when Winston Churchill instituted the Admiralty War Staff, Drax was the first of 15 officers selected to attend the new staff officer course. He was promoted to commander during the course and then appointed War Staff Officer to Sir David Beatty in the 1st Battlecruiser Squadron, an appointment he held until his promotion in 1916.

He served during the First World War aboard the battlecruiser HMS Lion and was present at the naval battles of Heligoland Bight, Dogger Bank and Jutland. He was promoted captain on 30 June 1916.

He was awarded the Distinguished Service Order in 1918 for his command of HMS Blanche.

Interwar period 
Drax held a series of senior naval appointments between the wars. From 1919 to 1922, he was Director of the Naval Staff College, Greenwich. He then served as President of the Naval Allied Control Commission in Germany from 1923 to 1924.

As a Rear Admiral, he commanded the 2nd Battle Squadron of the Home Fleet from 1929 to 1930. From 1930 to 1932 he was ashore in the Admiralty as Director of Naval Mobilisation Department that became the Department of Manning.

Promoted to Vice Admiral on 24 September 1932, he held from 1932 to 1934 the much-sought post of Commander of the America and West Indies Squadron.

From 1935 to 1938, he was Commander-in-Chief, Plymouth.

Mission to Moscow 

He was the British half of the Anglo-French delegation sent to Moscow in August 1939 alongside Aime Doumenc to discuss a possible alliance with the USSR with Soviet War Minister Kliment Voroshilov. As an indication of the low priority the Allied governments put on the mission, it was sent by sea aboard the outdated merchant ship City of Exeter on a slow voyage to Leningrad. The Soviets did not take the delegation seriously because Drax did not have any power to make decisions without the approval of the British government, rendering him next to powerless. Furthermore, although the Allied governments were willing to grant the Red Army transit rights through Poland and Romania they were unwilling to allow them to enter Polish Galicia and the Vilno Gap. Joseph Stalin told his foreign minister Vyacheslav Molotov "They're not being serious. These people can't have the proper authority. London and Paris are playing poker again." The British government also ignored advice to send an officer of equivalent rank as Edmund Ironside, who had been sent on a similar mission to meet Polish Marshal Edward Rydz-Śmigły in Warsaw.

Second World War
In December 1939, Drax was appointed Commander-in-Chief, The Nore, serving until 1941. It was an important post, as he was responsible for the protection of the east coast convoys from Scotland to London. He faced the multiple threats of acoustic mines and magnetic mines as well as attacks from Wehrmacht air and surface vessels, especially after the fall of the Netherlands and of Belgium. In October 1939 he was appointed President of the Board of Inquiry into the sinking of HMS Royal Oak by the Kriegsmarine submarine U-47.

As the war continued, advancing years caused him to retire from the active navy list and to join the British Home Guard. Nonetheless, he went to sea from 1943 to 1945 as a convoy commodore during the Battle of the Atlantic.

Alongside Admiral Herbert Richmond and Vice-Admiral Kenneth Dewar, Drax was considered to be an intellectual with controversial views, including the need for naval reform.

He was an early pioneer of solar heating.

Legacy
His friend, James Bond novelist Ian Fleming, named the character Sir Hugo Drax in his book Moonraker as a tribute.

Publications 

 He wrote a book entitled Handbook on Solar Heating (Montefiore Stalin 272)
 Admiral Drax's papers are at Churchill College, Cambridge.
 He is also referred to in David Niven's autobiography The Moon's a Balloon when he assisted in the starting of Niven's career.  Niven was on his uppers, having left the Army and adrift in Hollywood.  After a cocktail party on the Admiral's ship, he was deposited the following morning into the press barge at a PR junket for the launch of the film Mutiny on the Bounty.  Niven goes on to reveal it made him stand out and be recognised and become the only man "to crash Hollywood in a battleship".

Family 
In 1916, he married Kathleen Chalmers. They had four daughters and one son. 
Their youngest daughter, Mary (1925–2017), married Robert Rothschild in her second marriage. 
Their son, Henry Walter Plunkett-Ernle-Erle-Drax (1928–2017), is the father of Richard Drax, Conservative MP for South Dorset since the 2010 general election.

Notes

References

External links
 

|-

|-

|-

1880 births
1967 deaths
Reginald
Younger sons of barons
Ernle family
Reginald
People from Marylebone
People educated at Cheam School
Military personnel from London
Royal Navy officers of World War I
Royal Navy admirals
Companions of the Distinguished Service Order
Knights Commander of the Order of the Bath
Knights Grand Cross of the Order of Orange-Nassau
Recipients of the Order of Saint Stanislaus (Russian), 2nd class